Afro-Asians (or African Asians) are African communities that have been living in the Indian Subcontinent for centuries and have settled in countries such as India, Pakistan and Sri Lanka.

This includes the Siddis (who have been in India and Pakistan for over a thousand years) and Kaffirs in Sri Lanka.

East African slave trade 
The slave trade in Asia predates the Atlantic slave trade. The first Siddis were brought as slaves by Arab traders to India in 628 AD at the Bharuch port. 

Siddis were also brought as slaves by the Deccan Sultanates. Several former slaves rose to high ranks in the military and administration, the most prominent of which was Malik Ambar.

A few Bantu peoples from Southeast Africa were also imported to the Indian subcontinent in the 16th century as household slaves by the Portuguese. However, most of these Africans escaped the Portuguese territories and remained Muslim rather than become Catholic (Islam was not allowed to be practiced in Portuguese territories due to the existing Portuguese laws against Islam), while a small minority of the escaped slaves became Hindus due to the surrounding native Hindu majority. The Nizam of Hyderabad also employed African-origin guards and soldiers.

By the 17th century, a struggle for imperialism grew among the British, French and Dutch. The French and Dutch required slave labour for plantations, farming, and agriculture, respectively. Whilst the British required slaves for their navy, marine yards and for work as caulkers in the East India Company. The battle for supremacy in the area eventually led to the British domination, which lasted until the 19th century.

Conditions for Afro-Asian slaves 
Although slavery was oppressive and brutal in India and slaves were flogged or forced to work with little food, some gained access to some wealth and power, particularly during the Muslim era.

As slaves, the Sheedi were allowed some degree of social mobility so it was possible for them to be placed in high positions within the military and governing bodies. Muslim slaves were also allowed to become educated, marry freely, become political advisers, recruit other slaves through purchase, inducements, or capture.

Abolition of slavery

By the 19th century, the British had abolished the slave trade but efforts by the British in the Indian subcontinent and other European imperialists were made to circumvent this. However, across all eras, there was a steady demand for personal slaves employed as domestic helpers. They were seen as indicators of high social status. The economic situation of the people determined the demand for slaves and was the underlying factor in the nature of slavery that developed in the Indian Subcontinent. 

During the era of British and other European imperialism and colonialism, the Afro-Asians became further marginalised as the imperialists brought in attitudes about race into a complicated social and class system. Many of the Afro-Asians were systematically divided into settlements so that they could not politically organise. Instead, they were encouraged to assimilate.

Assimilation and acculturation 
Due to the type of slavery that encouraged assimilation, many Afro-Asians assimilated into the mainstream culture of British India and adopted the language, religion, names, and rituals of the surrounding cultures. The formerly enslaved adopted the culture of their former slave masters (both Indian and British).

Many Sheedis still retain some of their African traditions. Many Sheedis are either Muslim (mainly in Pakistan) or Hindu (mainly in India). A minority are Christian (both Protestant and Catholic).

In recent years, after the World Conference Against Racism in Durban South Africa, many have tried to organise politically so that they can improve their poor economic conditions.

Influences on Afro-Asian culture

Sports 
There have been athletes who rose to fame in the fields of running and wrestling.

Afro-Asian Diaspora in South Asia

African Diaspora in India
The Siddis are the largest settlement of slave descendants in India, many settled around the western coast and hinterland in cities like Janjira, Gujarat and Goa. Today, it is estimated there about 6,000-7,000 Siddis in Gujarat (India) and 400 in Mumbai.

African Diaspora in Pakistan
Pakistani African descents consist of the "Makrani", "Sheedi" or "Habshi". The Makrani (Urdu/Persian: مکرانی) are the inhabitants of Makran coast of Balochistan in Pakistan and lower Sindh. The Sheedi in Karachi live in the area of Lyari and other nearby coastal areas. Although most people use the term Sheedi to describe many of the African populations in Pakistan, they are not all Sheedis.

Shada ayesha
The Sheedis are divided into four clans or houses: Kharadar Makan, Hyderabad Makan, Lassi Makan and Belaro Makan. The Sufi saint Pir Mangho is regarded by many as the patron saint of the Sheedis and the annual Sheedi Mela festival, is the key event in the Sheedi community's cultural calendar. Some glimpses of the rituals at Sidi/Sheedi Festival 2010 include visit to sacred alligators at Mangho pir, playing music and dance.

Black African identity
Many of Afro-Pakistanis are described to have "assimilated" themselves into the "dominant culture". The Sheedis have assimilated into Pakistani Baloch culture; the instrument, songs and dance of the Sheedis appear to be derived from Africa. Linguistically, Makranis are Balochi and Sindhi and speak a dialect of Urdu referred to as Makrani. Their local culture has been influential in shaping the dominant culture of Pakistan. The musical anthem of the ruling Pakistan Peoples Party, Bija Teer, is a Balochi song in the musical style of the Sheedis with Black African style rhythm and drums.

African Diaspora in Sri Lanka
The Sri Lankan Kaffirs (cafrinhas in Portuguese, rendered as kāpiriyō (කාපිරි) in Sinhala and kāpili (காப்பிலி) in Tamil), are a Sri Lankan community that emerged in the 16th-century due to Portuguese colonialism.

Imperialism
When Dutch colonialists arrived in about 1600, the Kaffirs worked on cinnamon plantations along the southern coast. The Kaffirs ancestors were chained up and forced by the Dutch to take on the Sinhalese Kingdom. After the Dutch were successfully repelled by the Sinhalese in 1796, the Kaffirs were further marginalized by an influx of Indian laborers, who were imported by the British and who took most work on tea and rubber estates. The descendants of the original Africans or Kaffirs survive  in pockets along the island's coastal regions of Trincomalee, Batticaloa and Negombo.

African identity
Sri Lankans of African descent are proud to be Sri Lankans. They also acknowledge their African history. Kaffirs have an orally recorded history by the families who are descendants of former Sinhalese slave traders. A substantial population among those Sri Lankans of African descent are believed to have roots in the region that today corresponds to the Republic of Mozambique. The community's classical traditions of dance and song performance are described as the strongest indicators of the communities cultural retention of and fidelity in preserving Africa's ancient traditions of religions, culture and civilization.
The term Kaffir means 'non-believer' in the Arabic language, though it does not hold the same pejorative implications of the word as it would in countries like South Africa; its continued use by certain sections of Sri Lankan people is defended on the basis that term is not intended to be used as a racial slur.

Many Sri Lankans of African descent speak what has been described as a "creole" mixture of both the Sinhalese and Tamil languages. The community of Sri Lankans of African descent are also described as having been "assimilated" over the years as they have married Tamils and Sinhalese Sri Lankans.

Afro-Sri Lankans today
The education level of the community is consistent with that of rural Sri Lankan populations. They have become dis-empowered (they were used as soldiers by the Europeans) since the European colonizers have left the island and have tried to find their role in Sri Lankan society.

See also 
 Afro-Asians
 Afro-Arab
 Afro-Indians
 Afro-Iranians
 African Pakistani
 Afro-Turks
 Marabou (ethnicity)
 Swahili coast

References

People of African descent
Slavery in Asia
Ethnic groups in the Maldives
African diaspora in India
African diaspora in Pakistan
African diaspora in Sri Lanka
African slave trade
Mozambican diaspora in Asia
Swahili culture
Malawian diaspora
Ethiopian diaspora in Asia
Slavery in India
Slavery in Oman